"Santa Fe" is a song written by David Bellamy and Ron Taylor, and recorded by American country music duo The Bellamy Brothers.  It was released in January 1988 as the second single from the album Crazy from the Heart.  The song reached number 5 on the Billboard Hot Country Singles & Tracks chart.

Charts

Weekly charts

Year-end charts

References

1988 singles
1987 songs
The Bellamy Brothers songs
Song recordings produced by Emory Gordy Jr.
MCA Records singles
Curb Records singles
Songs written by David Bellamy (singer)